Clube Esportivo Aimoré, commonly referred to as Aimoré, is a Brazilian football club based in São Leopoldo, Rio Grande do Sul. The club competes in the Série D, the fourth tier of the Brazilian football league system, as well as in the Campeonato Gaúcho Série A, the top division in the Rio Grande do Sul state football league system.

History
The club was founded on March 26, 1936. Aimoré closed its football department in 1996, reopening it ten years later, in 2006. They won the Campeonato Gaúcho Third Level in 2012.

Achievements
 Campeonato Gaúcho Third Level:
 Winners (1): 2012

Stadium
Clube Esportivo Aimoré play their home games at Estádio João Corrêa da Silveira, nicknamed Estádio Cristo Rei. The stadium has a maximum capacity of 12,000 people.

Current squad

References

Association football clubs established in 1936
Football clubs in Rio Grande do Sul
1936 establishments in Brazil